Carex typhina, common name cattail sedge, is a species of Carex native to North America.

Conservation status
It is listed as a special concern species in Connecticut, as possibly extirpated in Maine, as threatened in Massachusetts, Michigan, and New York (state), and as endangered in Pennsylvania.

References

typhina
Endangered flora of the United States
Flora without expected TNC conservation status